Gowd-e Banushir (also Romanized as Gowd-e Banūshīr; also known as Gowd-e Banashīr) is a village in Barez Rural District, Manj District, Lordegan County, Chaharmahal and Bakhtiari Province, Iran. At the 2006 census, its population was 25, in 4 families.

References 

Populated places in Lordegan County